Ptolemy Macron (fl. 2nd century BCE) was a general of King Antiochus IV Epiphanes (c. 215 BCE – 164 BCE), head of the Seleucid Empire, a Greek state in Western Asia. His life is covered in parts of the first two Books of the Maccabees, which call him the son of Dorymenes and give him the cognomen "Macron".

Biography
According to  II Macc. x. 12, Ptolemy Macron abandoned Cyprus, which had been entrusted to him by the Egyptian king Ptolemy Philometor. The passage in Polybius and the biography which the Suda gives of Ptolemy Macron refer to his conduct in Cyprus. 

Ptolemy Macron then went over to Antiochus Epiphanes, and was sent by the chancellor Lysias with the generals Nicanor and Gorgias to defeat the Maccabean Revolt (167 to 160 BCE). In II Macc. viii. 8-11 Ptolemy is called governor of Cœle-Syria and Phenicia, who as such sent Nicanor and Gorgias against the Jews. 

The Jewish leader Menelaus sent Ptolemy many presents to secure his intercession with the king. But because Ptolemy tried to treat the Jews kindly, he was denounced before the king, whereupon he ended his life by poison.

Notes

References

Attribution:

Seleucid generals
2nd-century BC deaths
Seleucid people in the books of the Maccabees